Whitemargin stargazer (Uranoscopus sulphureus) is a fish of family Uranoscopidae, widespread in the Indopacific: Red Sea, Indonesia, Fiji, Samoa, and Tonga. Marine reef-associated fish, up to 45.0 cm maximal length.

Sources 

Uranoscopus
Fish of Asia
Fish of the Red Sea
Taxa named by Achille Valenciennes
Fish described in 1832